The Suquamish Clearwater Casino Resort (also known as the Clearwater Casino) is a casino and hotel located in Kitsap County, Washington, and owned by Port Madison Enterprises, the economic development authority of the Suquamish tribe.

History
The land on which the Clearwater Casino is sited was purchased by the Suquamish in 1988 and, early on, hosted a tribal smoke shop. In 1992 the Suquamish tribe opened a bingo hall on the site. This was followed by a fabric tent housing a small casino in 1995. A permanent casino building was constructed in 2003, followed by an 85-room hotel in 2006. In 2015, a further expansion increased convention and meeting space and grew hotel capacity by an additional 98 rooms. 

Initially the land on which the casino was located was tribal-owned, but not part of the designated tribal trust lands. As such, property taxes were paid by the Suquamish to Kitsap County. A 1991 attempt by the tribe to re-designate the site as tribal territory failed due to the presence of liens on the property. The tribe began another attempt to have the casino property re-designated trust land in 2003, a process that finally saw fruition in 2009. Prior to the transfer, local government officials estimated the re-designation would cost the county approximately $458,000 per year in lost tax revenue.

Features

Gaming

According to the casino, it operates more than 1200 slot machines, as well as keno and table games such a roulette and craps. The casino also has a poker room.

Economic impact
In 2007, trade magazine Indian Gaming reported the tribe's several businesses, of which the casino is the largest, created a local economic impact of more than $138 million.

See also
List of casinos in Washington 
List of casinos in the United States 
List of casino hotels

References

External links
Official Website

Casinos in Washington (state)
Casino hotels
Native American casinos
1995 establishments in Washington (state)
Casinos completed in 1995
Hotel buildings completed in 2006